Ilias Georgiou is a Greek Cypriot male artistic gymnast, representing his nation in international competitions.

Career
As a junior he competed for Cyprus in the 2016 European Men's Artistic Gymnastics Championships in the all-around final. At the 2018 Commonwealth Games he again competed in the team final for Cyprus and qualified for the event finals in all-around, parallel bars, and horizontal bar. The same year he competed at the 2018 Mediterranean Games, placing 5th in the horizontal bar and 7th in the all-around and parallel bars.

His first international medals came in the 2019 FIG Artistic Gymnastics World Cup series, in which he won the silver in horizontal bar at Cottbus, bronze in horizontal bar at Osijek, and bronze in parallel bars at Koper. At the 2021 FIG Artistic Gymnastics World Cup series in Cairo, he took silvers for parallel bars and horizontal bar. At the 2021 World Artistic Gymnastics Championships he qualified for the finals in the all-around and horizontal bar, placing 7th in each qualifier, but he withdrew from the all-around competition after the first rotation.

References

1999 births
Living people
Cypriot male artistic gymnasts
Gymnasts at the 2018 Commonwealth Games
Commonwealth Games medallists in gymnastics
Gymnasts at the 2022 Commonwealth Games
Commonwealth Games bronze medallists for Cyprus
Commonwealth Games gold medallists for Cyprus
Medallists at the 2022 Commonwealth Games